Aaron Yan (born Wu Keng-lin on 20 November 1985) is a Taiwanese actor, singer, television host and businessman. He was also one of the members of Taiwanese boy band Fahrenheit.

Life and career

1985–2005: Early life and career beginnings 
Yan was born as Wu Keng-lin in Taipei, Taiwan on 20 November 1985. When he was very young, he and his family moved to Connecticut, United States, where he lived for five years, and then moved back to Taiwan. In 2004, Yan posted some of his pictures on a public blog and was scouted by Taiwanese management company, Comic Productions. In August 2004, he made his acting debut in Taiwanese drama, I Love My Wife. In 2005, after signing with Comic Productions and HIM International Music, Yan starred in Taiwanese dramas, It Started with a Kiss and KO One.

2005–2011: Fahrenheit 

In December 2005, he formed a boy band named Fahrenheit with three other Taiwanese artists: Wu Chun, Jiro Wang, and Calvin Chen. In September 2006, Fahrenheit released their eponymous debut studio album, Fahrenheit, and they won a Hito Music Award for Best Boy Band.

In 2007, Yan reprised his roles in the sequels The X-Family and They Kiss Again. In November 2008, Yan played his first leading role in Taiwanese suspense drama, Mysterious Incredible Terminator. He also starred in Love Buffet and Gloomy Salad Days.

2011–present: Solo career 
In March 2011, Yan released his debut extended play, The Next Me.
The album spent 5 weeks at the number 1 spot on the G-Music chart.

In May 2012, Yan starred in Taiwanese musical drama, Alice in Wonder City. In October 2012, he released his debut studio album, The Moment.

In June 2013, Yan starred in Taiwanese romantic comedy drama, Just You. The drama topped ratings in its timeslot during its run.

In February 2014, Yan starred in Taiwanese metropolitan romance drama, Fall in Love with Me. Yan won the Asia Star Award at the Seoul International Drama Awards. In May 2014, he released his second extended play, Drama. In June 2014, he released his third extended play, Cut.

In March 2015, Yan debuted in Japan with the single titled, "Moisturizing". The album debuted within the top ten spots on the Oricon Singles Chart. In September 2015, he released his second Japanese single, "Gelato".

In March 2016, Yan starred in Taiwanese workplace romance drama, Refresh Man. The drama was a massive hit both domestically as well as across Asia, boosting Yan's popularity to a new high. In June 2016, Yan released his third Japanese single "Monochrome Dandy". The single peaked at number 8 on the Oricon Singles Chart.

In 2017, Yan was cast in the Chinese romance drama, Memories of Love.

In 2018, Yan released his forth extended play Where I Belong.
The same year Yan released his fifth extended play Dear Monster which includes the single "Sleeping Titan".

In 2019, Yan starred as the male lead in period suspense drama Please Give Me a Pair of Wings. The same year, he co-starred in the romance comedy drama Kiss Love, and Taste.

On 7 May 2020, Yan launched his Taiwan mazesoba brand, Yan's Collection.

On 25 Dec 2020, Yan released sixth extended play "Metropolis" which comprises self-composed songs.

Filmography

Film

Television series

Hosting

Music video appearances

Discography

Studio albums

Extended plays

Singles

Awards

References

External links 

 

Taiwanese male television actors
Taiwanese male film actors
21st-century Taiwanese male actors
21st-century Taiwanese male singers
Male actors from Taipei
Gay singers
Taiwanese gay actors
Taiwanese gay musicians
20th-century Taiwanese LGBT people
21st-century Taiwanese LGBT people
Taiwanese LGBT singers